Banca Centropadana Credito Cooperativo, Società Cooperativa is an Italian cooperative bank based in Guardamiglio, Lombardy. The bank was a member of Federazione Italiana delle Banche di Credito Cooperativo - Casse Rurali ed Artigiane (Federcasse) and Federazione Lombarda delle Banche di Credito Cooperativo (Lombard Co-operative Banks Federation, holding 2.09%).

History
The bank was founded in 1971 in Guardamiglio as a merger of three rural credit unions.

In 2014 Banca Centropadana acquired some branches of Banca Farnese from Cassa di Risparmio di Ferrara.

In 2016, due to banking reform of BCC banks (Law N°49/2016), the bank joined a banking group. The reform allowed banks with more than €200 million shareholders' equity to join a banking group or demutualize, forming a società per azioni. Banca Centropadana chose to remain as a co-operative bank.

Sponsorship
 Italian football club Piacenza Calcio 1919

References

Cooperative banks of Italy
Companies based in Lombardy
Banks established in 1971
Italian companies established in 1971
Province of Lodi